Out on a Limb with Clark Terry is an album by American jazz trumpeter Clark Terry featuring tracks recorded in 1957 and released on the Argo label. The album was released on CD combined with Paul Gonsalves' Cookin' (Argo, 1957) as Daylight Express in 1998.

Reception

AllMusic awarded the original album 3 stars.

Track listing
All compositions by Clark Terry, except where indicated.
 "Caravan" (Juan Tizol) - 2:01     
 "Candy" (Mack David, Alex Kramer, Joan Whitney) - 2:21     
 "Clark's Expedition" (Mike Simpson, Clark Terry) - 2:29     
 "Trumpet Mouthpiece Blues" - 4:05     
 "Phalanges" (Clark Terry, Louie Bellson) - 3:02     
 "Blues for Daddy-O's Jazz Patio Blues" - 4:32     
 "Basin Street Blues" (Spencer Williams) - 2:44     
 "Daylight Express" - 2:16     
 "Taking a Chance on Love" (Vernon Duke, Ted Fetter, John La Touche) - 2:18

Personnel 
Clark Terry - trumpet
Mike Simpson  - saxophone, flute
Remo Biondi - guitar
Willie Jones - piano
Jimmy Woode - bass
Sam Woodyard - drums

References 

1958 albums
Clark Terry albums
Argo Records albums